Jan Nathaniel du Plessis (born 16 November 1982 in Bethlehem, Free State) is a South African rugby union player, who plays as a prop for  in the French Top 14 and the Lions in Super Rugby. He won 70 caps for South Africa between 2007 and 2015.

Personal and early life
Du Plessis showed promise as a rugby player early, being named as captain of the Eastern Free State age-group team at Craven Week in 1995. While he continued to advance in rugby, playing for Free State representative teams at under-18 and under-19 level, he never represented South Africa at junior level.

He studied medicine at the University of the Free State and worked as a doctor, making him one of the few players in the professional era of rugby union to have another career outside of the sport.

Rugby career
He eventually made the senior Free State Cheetahs side in 2003, and continued playing for the Cheetahs through the 2007 Currie Cup. Du Plessis was also named to a South African squad that faced a World XV at Ellis Park in 2006.

Du Plessis made his Super 14 debut in 2006 for the Cheetahs. His 2007 Super 14 campaign was hampered by an ankle injury. After recovering, he was selected for the Springboks squad for the first time during the 2007 Tri Nations, making his debut in the starting XV on 7 July against Australia during the Boks' home leg. The match was significant for him in another way, as his younger brother Bismarck made his Boks debut as a substitute in the same match while he was still on the field. This made the Du Plessis brothers the 23rd set of brothers to earn Springboks caps.

Neither Jannie nor Bismarck was named to the Springboks' original squad for the 2007 Rugby World Cup, but both eventually joined the squad. After Bismarck had already been called up to replace Pierre Spies, Jannie was called up to replace BJ Botha after Botha blew out a knee against the USA in the Boks' final pool match. He received the call notifying him of his selection from Springboks selection panel member Peter Jooste early in the morning of 1 October, shortly after finishing an all-night shift at a Bloemfontein hospital on the evening of 30 September, during which he performed a Caesarean section. When interviewed after his selection, he said that his first sleep since 29 September was "an hour or so on the plane from Bloemfontein to Cape Town", where he travelled to do his required paperwork before joining the Boks in France. On 7 October, he was starting for the Boks in their quarterfinal against Fiji, after CJ van der Linde was ruled out with a knee injury.

A week after the Boks' victory over England in the Rugby World Cup final, Du Plessis was in the squad for another final – the 2007 Currie Cup final, in which the Cheetahs defeated the Golden Lions 20–18. Because of his late call-up to the World Cup squad, he was the only member of the World Cup winners to play in enough Currie Cup matches to qualify for the final (at least four are required). Du Plessis joined three members of the 1995 Rugby World Cup winners as the only players to earn World Cup and Currie Cup winners' medals in the same year.

Du Plessis had to use his medical skills unexpectedly in 2009. In the early morning hours of 29 March, Brumbies lock Shawn Mackay was hit by a car outside a Durban nightclub, suffering a paralysing injury. Du Plessis was at the scene because he was helping Brumbies players get back to their hotel after their match with the Sharks; he helped Mackay breathe and contacted emergency services, who stabilised him and rushed him to a hospital. However, Mackay died from complications of his injuries several days later.

Notes

References

External links

Jannie du Plessis at Genslin Springbok stats

1982 births
Living people
People from Bethlehem, Free State
Afrikaner people
South African expatriates in France
Expatriate rugby union players in France
21st-century South African physicians
South African rugby union players
South Africa international rugby union players
Cheetahs (rugby union) players
Free State Cheetahs players
Rugby union props
Alumni of Grey College, Bloemfontein
Sharks (Currie Cup) players
Sharks (rugby union) players
Montpellier Hérault Rugby players
Lions (United Rugby Championship) players
Golden Lions players
Rugby union players from the Free State (province)